Csató Adorján, mainly known by his main alias Funktasztikus, is a Hungarian MC and rapper. His birthplace was Mezőkövesd, but his birth date is unknown. He was member of the band Kamikaze. He describes his style of rapping as fast paced and is compared to Twista and Busta Rhymes.

Discography
 1997 - Csak szavak
 1998 - A táncparkett varázsa (Vol.1)
 1999 - A táncparkett varázsa (Vol.2)
 2000 - Funknstein és a Klikk - 139 km
 2001 - Da Flava család
 2002 - Egy átlagos külvárosi történet
 2002 - Kamikaze: Nomen est Omen (Nevében a végzete)
 2003 - LTP
 2005 - Kamikaze: Halálosan komolyan
 2006 - Kamikaze: Tragikomédia
 2009 - Jelentések Fanyarországról
 2011 - Táncdalok, sanzonok, melodrámák
 2014 - Tartsd lent!
 2019 - Rezonancia, avagy a próféta alvilági zarándoklata (A titkos krónika)

Sources/External links (in Hungarian)
 http://www.zeneszoveg.hu/egyuttes/3415/funktasztikus--dalszovegei.html
 https://www.facebook.com/pages/Funktasztikus/187649627940299?sk=info

References

Hungarian rappers
Living people
Year of birth missing (living people)
People from Mezőkövesd